The Burnside Masonic Lodge, in Burnside, Kentucky, was built in 1910.  It was listed on the National Register of Historic Places in 1984 as Burnside Lodge.

A Masonic lodge chapter was formed in Burnside in 1887 and had this building built in 1910.  It is a one-story brick building, with brick laid in seven-course common bond.

It is located off U.S. Route 27.

References

External links
Burnside Masonic Lodge 634, a Facebook page

Masonic buildings in Kentucky
National Register of Historic Places in Pulaski County, Kentucky
Cultural infrastructure completed in 1910
1910 establishments in Kentucky
Clubhouses on the National Register of Historic Places in Kentucky